Ptolemy, son of Philip was an officer who commanded the leading squadron of Macedonian cavalry (that of Socrates) at the Battle of the Granicus. Both Gronovius and Droysen, suppose that he is the same man that Alexander left with a force of 3,000 infantry and 200 cavalry to defend the province of Caria, and who subsequently, together with Asander the governor of Lydia, defeated the Persian general Orontobates, 332 BC.

Notes

References
Who's Who in the Age of Alexander the Great by Waldemar Heckel 

Generals of Alexander the Great